Pine Street Art Works is a privately owned art gallery and store, in Burlington, Vermont, showing 20th and 21st century painting and photography, as well 20th century posters, chromolithographs and assorted works on paper.

The  gallery is located in a former factory, which was built during the mid 20th century, to dress fibers and bristles for brooms and brushes. The creation of the gallery involved renovation of the interior, leaving the exterior as it was.

References

Art museums and galleries in Vermont
Contemporary art galleries in the United States
Buildings and structures in Burlington, Vermont
Tourist attractions in Burlington, Vermont